Wee Wee may refer to:
 Wee-wee, euphemism for urination
 Wee Wee Hill, hill in Indiana
 "Wee Wee Hours", Chuck Berry song
 In the Wee Wee Hours..., 1987 documentary film